Aleksander Groza (1807–1875) was a Polish poet and writer.

References

1807 births
1875 deaths
Polish male poets
19th-century Polish poets